Anantharam (అనంతారం) is a village located in the Bhuvanagiri Mandal, Yadadri Bhuvanagiri district, Telangana, India. About 5 km from Bhongir,1 km from National Highway 215 (Warangal to Hyderabad), 40 km From Hyderabad city. According to the census of 2001, the village has 452 households and a total population of 2441.
Anantharam village was given an ideal village award during the years of 2006-2013 by United Andhra pradesh.

List of gram pachayath Sarpanch 
This is the list of Gram panchayat Sarpanch of Anantharam

References

Villages in Yadadri Bhuvanagiri district